Old Roses is a 1935 British crime film directed by Bernard Mainwaring and starring Horace Hodges, Nancy Burne and Bruce Lester. The screenplay concerns an elderly man who assists the police in solving a murder, but accidentally reveals his own criminal past in the process.

Cast
 Horace Hodges as Johnnie Lee 
 Nancy Burne as Jenny Erroll 
 Bruce Lester as Chris Morgan
 Charles Mortimer as John Morgan 
 Felix Aylmer as Lord Sandelbury 
 Wilfred Walter as Sweeton 
 Esme Church as Mrs Erroll 
 George Hayes  Simes 
 Eric Portman as Lou 
 Trefor Jones as Singing Gypsy

References

External links

1935 films
1935 crime films
Films directed by Bernard Mainwaring
Fox Film films
British black-and-white films
British crime films
1930s English-language films
1930s American films
1930s British films